Choqa Said (also Romanized as Choqā Sa‘īd; also known as Choghā Sa‘īd and Choqā) is a village in Howmeh Rural District, in the Central District of Harsin County, Kermanshah Province, Iran. At the 2006 census, its population was 530, in 127 families.

References 

Populated places in Harsin County